The Wild Animal Control Act 1977 is a current Act of Parliament in New Zealand. It is administered by the Department of Conservation.

Part 3 of the Act establishes recreational hunting areas (RHAs). If the wild animal species are not kept in check, commercial hunting is allowed. At present the following RHAs have been established:
North Island:
Kaweka (East Coast/Hawkes Bay)
Kaimanawa (Tongariro/Taupo)
North Pureora Conservation Park (Waikato)
Haurangi (Wellington)
South Island
Blue Mountains - (Southland)
Greenstone/Caples - beside Lake Wakatipu (Otago)
Lake Sumner -  Nina, Doubtful Range, North Hurunui and Hurunui restricted hunting block (Canterbury)
Oxford - Mt Oxford and Mt Thomas forest parks (Canterbury)

See also
Hunting in New Zealand
Conservation in New Zealand

References

External links
Text of the Act

Statutes of New Zealand
1977 in the environment
1977 in New Zealand law
Wildlife law
Hunting legislation